Himatione is a genus of Hawaiian honeycreepers in the subfamily Carduelinae of the family Fringillidae.

Species
It contains the following species:
 Laysan honeycreeper (Himatione fraithii) (extinct)
 ʻApapane (Himatione sanguinea)

See also
 

 
Hawaiian honeycreepers
Endemic fauna of Hawaii
Bird genera
Bird genera with one living species
Carduelinae
Higher-level bird taxa restricted to the Australasia-Pacific region
Taxonomy articles created by Polbot